Hopea vesquei is a tree in the family Dipterocarpaceae, native to Borneo. It is named for the French botanist Julien Joseph Vesque.

Description
The bark is cracked in places.

Distribution and habitat
Hopea vesquei is endemic to Borneo.

References

vesquei
Endemic flora of Borneo
Plants described in 1891